William Broughton may refer to:

William Robert Broughton (1762–1821), British naval officer who explored parts of the Pacific Ocean
William Broughton (magistrate) (1768–1821), early settler and magistrate in New South Wales
William Broughton (bishop) (1788–1853), first Anglican bishop of Australia
Bill Broughton (William James Broughton, 1913–1990), New Zealand jockey

See also
William Broughton Davies (1831–1906), Sierra Leonean medical doctor
William Broughton Carr (1836–1909), British author and beekeeper